Shakeel Siddiqui (born 26 May 1964) is a Pakistani television stand-up comedian also known as 'Teeli' in Pakistan. He is regarded as one of the greatest comedian Pakistan has ever produced. He rose to prominence in Bollywood after appearing as a contestant in Comedy Circus. Although he didn't win, he became so popular that he was hired as a co-host in the second season of the show. He was paired to actress Urvashi Dholakia in reality show, Ustaadon Ka Ustaad (2008).

Shakeel Siddiqui also appeared as a celebrity guest in Salman Khan's reality game show, Dus Ka Dum (2008) and as a guest judge in Boogie Woogie dance competition. He was also a participant in the third season of Comedy Circus, dubbed Kaante Ki Takkar.

Career

Early career in theatre
Shakeel in his earlier career quite did not click until he was found by Umar Shareef which eventually made him a big theater artist both worked in several Stage Dramas together such as Dulhan Main Lekar Jaonga. Shakeel's role in stage plays and films were quite popular, he worked with Indian comedians like Johnny Lever. Shakeel Siddiqui performance was notable in stage dramas Beauty Parlour, Budha Ghar pay hai, Chand baraye Farokht and Nayi Ami Puranay Abba. His situational jokes for Shruti Seth on the sets of Comedy Circus made the Indian audience absolute stunned and his presence of mind has led him to marvelous success in India.
Shakeel Presently co-host a show with another stand up comedian Kashif Khan called Hazraaat on News Channel Abb takk

Before appearing on Comedy Circus, he had worked side by side with comedian Umer Sharif in Pakistani stage plays like "Bakra Qistoon Pay" (Goat on installments), "Yeh to Housefull Hogaya" (Full House), "Nayee Ammi Purana Abba" (New Mother Old Father) and many more.

Success in India
Shakeel was best known for his time in India for the show Comedy Circus where he was critically acclaimed as a king of stage comedy, he later stepped out of the competition by himself and participated separately on fan's choice alongside Urvashi Dholakia initially and, Shruti Seth and Mona Singh at the final season of his appearance. Among the other participants he became role model and participants like Swapnil often referred him as the best stand up of the show. Satish Shah and Archana praised Shakeel for his tremendous performances and cracking furious jokes on Shruti Seth. He appeared in Game Show Dus ka Dum on Sony Television. After 26/11 attack on Mumbai by Pakistan based Terrorists, all the Pakistan actors were asked to leave the country.

Departure from Indian television  
After the 2008 Mumbai Attacks some news channels and blogs reported that Shakeel was beaten and forced to leave India by locals due to 26/11 Mumbai attacks. However, he later denied being beaten or abused and claimed that the producers of Sony  were threatened by the members of MNS of "dire consequences" if they continue to allow Pakistanis to perform on their shows. As a safety precaution, the producers and the artist agreed to have him leave the country. This claim coincides with later reports. He has made several appearances on Indian TV shows since then.

Return to Indian television 
In early 2014 Shakeel made a comeback to Indian screen with Comedy Classes on Life Ok. and he become a great comedian

Filmography

Film

Reality shows

Theatre 
 1989 : Bakra Qistoon Pay
 2003 : Yeh to Housefull Hogaya
 2004 : Nayee Ammi Purana Abba

References

External links
 

Living people
Pakistani stand-up comedians
Comedians from Karachi
Pakistani male comedians
1964 births